Vladimir Petrić (born 5 August 1975) is a Serbian former handball player.

Club career
Petrić made his professional debut with Crvena zvezda and spent five seasons with the club (1994–1999), before moving abroad. He would go on to play for Fotex Veszprém (1999–2000), Porto (2000–2005), Almería (2005–2008), Cuenca (2008–2009), Sporting CP (2009–2011) and Vardar (2011–2015).

International career
Petrić represented Serbia and Montenegro (known as FR Yugoslavia until 2003) in international tournaments, taking part in three World Championships (1999, 2003, and 2005) and four European Championships (1998, 2002, 2004, and 2006). He previously won the gold medal at the 1998 World University Championship.

Honours
Crvena zvezda
 Handball Championship of FR Yugoslavia: 1995–96, 1996–97, 1997–98
 Handball Cup of FR Yugoslavia: 1994–95, 1995–96
Fotex Veszprém
 Magyar Kupa: 1999–2000
Porto
 Andebol 1: 2001–02, 2002–03, 2003–04
Vardar
 Macedonian Handball Super League: 2012–13, 2014–15
 Macedonian Handball Cup: 2011–12, 2013–14, 2014–15
 SEHA League: 2011–12, 2013–14

References

External links

1975 births
Living people
Sportspeople from Valjevo
Serbian male handball players
FC Porto handball players
RK Crvena zvezda players
Veszprém KC players
RK Vardar players
Liga ASOBAL players
Expatriate handball players
Serbian expatriate sportspeople in Hungary
Serbian expatriate sportspeople in Portugal
Serbian expatriate sportspeople in Spain
Serbian expatriate sportspeople in North Macedonia